JOnAS is an open-source implementation of the Java EE application server specification, developed and hosted by the OW2 consortium, having been originally been created by Groupe Bull. JOnAS is released under the LGPL 2.1 open-source license.

Java EE Certification 
JOnAS 5.1 is Java EE 5 certified, as of March 17, 2009. It was the first open-source server certified for free, using a process known as "J2EE scholarship" and established by Sun for non-profit organizations. The new JOnAS 5 architecture is based on top of an OSGi framework which makes the development of dynamic components much easier than before.

JOnAS 5.3 is Java EE 6 certified, but only for the web profile.

Management console 
JOnAS has a comparatively clear remote management console, providing easily accessible tools for remote uploading and deploying of the web applications, configuring both secure and ordinary web access ports and managing the user name - password - role datasets. This console is based on the JavaScript. From the first impression, the consoles of the comparable open source Java EE servers seem more confusing, with many needed features not immediately visible. This is, however, more important in the teaching process, as Java EE servers are not meant to be managed by the unprepared end user.

Java EE Environment 
JOnAS is an open source Java EE 6 application server. It provides a fully compliant EJB container through EasyBeans and is available with an embedded Tomcat or Jetty web container. Any 1.6 JVM is supported, and the attempts to run on a free stack with GNU Classpath are very promising. JOnAS can run on numerous operating systems including Linux, Windows, AIX, many Posix platforms, and others, as long as a suitable JVM is available.

OSGi Environment 
As of its version 5, JOnAS is fully based on the OSGi framework; using either Apache Felix, Eclipse Equinox or Knopflerfish (though the default JOnAS packaging comes with Apache Felix). This means that all JOnAS components are packaged as bundles, for example the full JOnAS profile comes with more than 250 bundles.

The service layer is implemented using Apache iPOJO, therefore most Java-EE-certified JOnAS services (persistence, EJB, resources, ...) are directly available as OSGi services to all OSGi bundles deployed on JOnAS. The inverse is also true: for example, an EJB3 can directly access any number of OSGi services using dynamic injection.

See also 

 Comparison of application servers
 EasyBeans

Notes

External links 
 JOnAS Project Web Site
 JOnAS team blog
 An article describing how to deploy EJB3s and web services in JOnAS 4

Free server software
Free software programmed in Java (programming language)
OW2
Java enterprise platform
Web server software programmed in Java